The 2002 Brisbane Sevens, officially called the 2002 Brisbane International Sevens, was an international rugby sevens tournament that was part of the World Sevens Series in the 2001–02 season. It was the Australian Sevens leg of the series, held at Ballymore Stadium in Brisbane over the weekend of the 2 and 3 March 2002.

The tournament was the second completed edition of the Australian Sevens, and was won by Australia who defeated New Zealand 28-0 in the Cup final.

Format
The teams were drawn into four pools of four teams each. Each team played the other teams in their pool once, with 3 points awarded for a win, 2 points for a draw, and 1 point for a loss (no points awarded for a forfeit). The top two teams from each pool advanced to the Cup/Plate brackets. The bottom two teams from each group went on to the Bowl/Shield brackets.

Teams
The participating teams were:

Pool Stage

Play on the first day of the tournament consisted of matches between teams in the same pool on a round robin basis. The following is a list of the recorded results.

Pool A

Pool B

Pool C

Pool D

Knockout stage

Play on the second day of the tournament consisted of finals matches for the Shield, Bowl, Plate, and Cup competitions. The following is a list of the recorded results.

Shield

Bowl

Plate

Cup

References

Australian Sevens
Brisbane Sevens
Brisbane Sevens